The 1993 Atlantic Coast Conference men's basketball tournament took place in Charlotte, North Carolina, at the second Charlotte Coliseum. The tournament marked the event's 40th anniversary. Georgia Tech won the tournament, defeating North Carolina, 77–75, in the championship game. North Carolina lost their second championship game in a row. James Forrest of Georgia Tech was named tournament MVP. The tournament was played with the backdrop of a rare March blizzard which raged across the southeastern United States. The semifinal game between North Carolina and Virginia was delayed during the second half by a storm-related power outage.

Bracket

AP rankings at time of tournament

External links
 

Tournament
ACC men's basketball tournament
College sports in North Carolina
Basketball competitions in Charlotte, North Carolina
ACC men's basketball tournament
ACC men's basketball tournament